The list of the governors of the Colombian Department of Córdoba

The Congress of Colombia approved by Law 9 December 17, 1951 which created the Department of Córdoba and later sanctioned by the then president of Colombia Roberto Urdaneta Arbeláez, but only came into effect six months later.

According to the Colombian Constitution of 1991 the executive power for this region will be vested in a single individual elected by popular vote (starting from 1991, governors were previously appointed by the president of Colombia) and will be called Governor of the Córdoba Department.

Governors of the Córdoba Department 
 Remberto Burgos Puche (President Organizational Committee) June 18, 1952, to August 22, 1952
 Manuel Antonio Buelvas Cabrales August 23, 1952, to October 7, 1953
 Miguel García Sánchez October 8, 1953, to May 10, 1957
 Eusebio Cabrales Pineda May 10, 1957, to January 17, 1958
 Eugenio Giraldo Revueltas January 18, 1958, to September 5, 1958
 José Jiménez Altamiranda September 6, 1958, to July 14, 1960
 Remberto Burgos Puche July 15, 1960, to October 6, 1962
 José Miguel Amín Araque October 6, 1962, to March 14, 1963
 Germán Bula Hoyos March 15, 1963, to October 4. 1964
 Ramón Berrocal Failach October 4, 1964, to August 25, 1966
 Amaury García Burgos August 26, 1966, to September 4, 1968
 Alfonso Ordosgoitia Yarzagaray September 5, 1968, to March 13, 1969
 Álvaro Sotomayor Macea March 14, 1969, to November 2, 1969
 Eugenio Giraldo Revueltas November 3, 1969, to August 31, 1970
 Amaury García Burgos August 31, 1970, to July 12, 1971
 Germán Bula Hoyos July 12, 1971, to May 25, 1972
 Donaldo Cabrales Anaya May 26, 1972, to August 15, 1974
 Casio Obregón Nieto August 16, 1974, to March 13, 1975
 Néstor Padrón Guzmán March 14, 1975, to November 7, 1975
 José María Cabrales November 7, 1975, to January 25, 1977
 Libardo López Gómez January 25, 1977, to October 27, 1977
 Ramón Martínez Vallejo October 28, 1977, to August 25, 1978
 Alfonso De la Espriella Espinosa August 25, 1978, to June 6, 1980
 Camilo Jiménez Villalba June 6, 1980, to March 25, 1981
 Gastón Berrocal Canabal March 25, 1981, to July 27, 1981
 Simón Gómez Villadiego July 28, 1981, to September 3, 1981 (Interim)
 Ramiro Sánchez Kerguelén September 4, 1981, to August 26, 1982
 Julio César Zapateiro Rodríguez August 27, 1982, to August 9, 1984
 Camilo Jiménez Villalba August 10, 1984, to January 28, 1985
 Fernando Salas Calle January 29, 1985, to August 21, 1986
 Héctor Lorduy Rodríguez August 22, 1986, to June 17, 1987
 José Gabriel Amín Manzur June 18, 1987, to January 10, 1990
 Raúl Quintero Lyons January 4, 1989, to January 15, 1989 (Interim)
 Fredy Sánchez Arteaga January 11, 1990, to August 22, 1990
 Jorge Ramón Elías Náder August 23, 1990, to June 11, 1991
 Carlos Henao Gallo June 12, 1991, to July 30, 1991 (Interim)
 Luciano Lepesquer Gossaín 30 de julio de 1991 a 31 de diciembre de 1991
 Jorge Manzur Jattin January 1, 1992, to January 19, 1994 (First popularly elected governor) 
 Javier Jiménez Amín January 20, 1994, to October 10, 1994 (Interim); October 11, 1994, to December 31, 1994
 Carlos Buelvas Aldana January 1, 1995, to December 31, 1997
 Ángel Villadiego Hernández January 1, 1998, to December 31, 2000
 Jesús María López Gómez January 1, 2001, to December 31, 2003
 Libardo José López Cabrales January 1, 2004, to April 17, 2006
 Jaime Torralvo Suárez April 17, 2006, to June 22, 2006
 Libardo José López Cabrales June 22, 2006, to December 31, 2007
 Marta Sáenz Correa January 1, 2008 to December 31, 2011
Alejandro Lyons January 1, 2012 to December 31, 2015
Edwin Besaile January 1, 2016 to January 18, 2018
Orlando Benítez January 1, 2020 - present

References

External links 
 Government of Cordoba official website